Paul Merab (real name: Petre Merabishvili, Geo. პეტრე მერაბიშვილი) (1876 in Ude, Georgia – 1930 in Paris), a Georgian physician, pharmacist and researcher of Ethiopia.

Merab was born in a Georgian Roman Catholic community, now Samtskhe-Javakheti region in south Georgia. A Sorbonne graduate, Merab was hired in Istanbul to work as a physician for the Ethiopian Emperor Menilek II for several years. He lived in Ethiopia from 1908 to 1929, except for the years of the First World War when he volunteered in the French military. In 1910, he founded the first pharmacy in Addis Ababa which he called "Pharmacie de la Géorgie". In 1929, he finally resettled to France, where he published his informative researches and memories of Ethiopia.

References 
1. Chris Prouty, Eugene Rosenfeld, Historical Dictionary of Ethiopia and Eritrea, p. 131. Scarecrow Press, 1994

2. ჟვანია ნ. საქართველო-ეთიოპიის ურთიერთობის ისტორიიდან // ქართველური მემკვიდრეობა . – 2000 . – ტ. 4 . – გვ. 282–285 [in Georgian]

Physicians from Georgia (country)
1876 births
1930 deaths
Expatriates from the Russian Empire in France
Expatriates from the Russian Empire in Ethiopia
University of Paris alumni
History of Ethiopia
Pharmacists from Georgia (country)
Georgian emigrants to France